Marta Štěrbová is a Czech orienteering competitor.

She won a bronze medal at the World Games in 2005 in the mixed relay, with Petr Losman, Tomáš Dlabaja and Dana Brožková. Her best achievements at the World Orienteering Championships are 5th in the relay in 2003 and in 2005, and 16th in the long distance in 2003.

See also
 Czech orienteers
 List of orienteers
 List of orienteering events

References

External links
 

Year of birth missing (living people)
Living people
Czech orienteers
Female orienteers
Foot orienteers
World Games bronze medalists

Competitors at the 2005 World Games
World Games medalists in orienteering